This article includes a list of Albanian monarchs. Albania was first established by the Progon family in 1190, with Progon, Lord of Kruja as the nation's first monarch.

Princes of Arbanon (1190–1256)

House of Progon
Progon (1190–1198)
Gjin Progoni (1198–1208)
Demetrio Progoni (1208–1216)
Gregory Kamonas (1216–1253)
Golem (1253–56)

Princes of Gropa (1258-1395)
Gropa family
Andrea I Gropa
Pal Gropa
Andrea II Gropa
Pal II Gropa
Zacharia Gropa

Captainate of Durazzo (1261-1272)
Andrea Vrana (1261-1272)

Kings of Albania (1272–1294)

Angevin Dynasty
Charles I (1272–1285)
Charles II (1285–1294)

Charles II surrendered his rights to Albania to his son Philip II in 1294. Philip II reigned as "Lord of the Kingdom of Albania" after 1304.

Princes of Berat (1280–1444)
Muzaka family
Andrea I Muzaka (1280–1319)
Teodor I Muzaka (1319–1331)
Andrea II Muzaka (1331–1372) – Despot of Albania
Teodor II Muzaka (1372–1389)
Teodor III Muzaka (1389-1444)

Princes of Matranga (1280-1367)
Mataranga family
Vlash Mataranga
Pal Matranga 
Vlash II Mataranga

Lords of the Kingdom of Albania (1304–1332)

Angevin Dynasty
Philip I (1304–1332)
Robert (1332)

Dukes of Durazzo (1332–1368)

Angevin Dynasty
John (1332–1336)
Charles (1336–1348)
Joanna (1348-1368)
Louis (1365–1368), in right of his wife.

Prince of Albania and Lord of Krujë (1328–1444)
Thopia family
Tanusio Thopia Count of Mat (1328-1338)
Andrea I Thopia (1338-1343)
Karl Thopia 1st reign (1355–1382) – Prince of Albania
Karl Thopia 2nd reign (1385–1387) – Prince of Albania
Gjergj Thopia (1387–1392)
Konstantin Balšić (1392-1402)
Helena Thopia (1402-1403)
Niketa Thopia (1403-1415)

Dukes of Valona (1345–1417)

John Komnenos Asen (1345–1363) 
Alexander Komnenos Asen (1363–1372)
Balša II (1372–1385)
Komnena (1385–1396)
Mrkša Žarković (1396–1414)
Ruđina Balšić (1414–1417)

Despots of Angelokastron and Lepanto (1358–1374)
Gjin Bua Shpata (1358–1374)

Despots of Arta (1358–1416)

Losha Dynasty
Pjetër Losha (1358–1374)

Shpata dynasty
Gjin Bua Shpata (1374–1399)
Muriq Shpata (1399–1415)
Jakup Shpata (1415–1416)

Prince of Gjirokastër (1373–1418)
Zenebishi family
Gjon Zenebishi (1373–1418)

Princes of Dukagjini (1387–1444)
Dukagjini family
Pal I Dukagjini and Leka I Dukagjini (1387–1393)
Tanush Dukagjini (1393–1438)
Pal II Dukagjini (1438–1444)

Princes of Arianiti
Arianiti family
Komnen Arianiti
Gjergj Arianiti

Princes of Kastrioti (1389–1444)
Kastrioti family

Pal Kastrioti (1383–1407)
Gjon Kastrioti (1407–1437)
 Gjergj Kastrioti Skanderbeg (1443-1468) – Lord of Albania

Princes of Zaharia (1396-1444)
Zaharia family
Koja Zaharia (1396-1430)
Lekë Zaharia (1436-1444)

Princes of Albania (1444–1479)
Kastrioti
 Gjergj Kastrioti Skanderbeg (1444–1468)
Dukagjini Family
Lekë III Dukagjini (1468–1479)

Pashalik of Shkodra (1757-1831)
Bushati family
Mehmed Bushati (1757–1774)
Mustafa Bushati (1774–1778)
Kara Mahmud Bushati (1778–1796)
Ibrahim Bushati (1796–1810)
Mustafa Sherifi (1810-1831)

Pashalak of Berat (1774-1809)
Ahmet Kurt Pasha (1774-1787)
Ibrahim Pasha of Berat (1787-1809)

Pashalik of Yanina (1787–1822)
Ali Pasha of Yanina (1787–1822)

Prince of (Modern) Albania (1914)

House of Wied

Heads of House of Wied (1914–1973, not ruling)

King of the Albanians (1928–1939)

House of Zogu

House of Zogu (1939–1945)

Italian Occupation (1939–1943)

House of Savoy

See also
List of heads of state of Albania
List of prime ministers of Albania

Bibliography
 Patrice Najbor, Histoire de l'Albanie et de sa maison royale (5 volumes), JePublie, Paris, 2008,.
 Patrice Najbor, La dynastye des Zogu, Textes & Prétextes, Paris, 2002.
 Monarkia Shqiptare 1928-1939, Qendra e Studimeve Albanologjike & Insitituti Historisë, Boetimet Toena, Tirana, 2011

References

External links
Albanian Royal Court
Maison royale d'Albanie 

 
Albania
Albanian